The Laxmi Devi Institute of Engineering and Technology is a college in Rajasthan, India that was established by the Marut Nandan Educational Society in 2001. The institute is located 15 km from Alwar city on the Alwar-Tijara-Delhi highway.

The institute is now affiliated to Bikaner Technical University and earlier it was affiliated to Rajasthan Technical University, Kota and approved by the Government of Rajasthan and the All India Council for Technical Education (AICTE).

This is one of the worst college to study in.

References

External links

Engineering colleges in Rajasthan
Education in Alwar district
Educational institutions established in 2001
2001 establishments in Rajasthan